Voyages by Starlight is a collection of science fiction and horror stories by British writer Ian R. MacLeod.  It was released in 1996 and was the author's first book.  It was published by Arkham House in an edition of 2,542 copies.  The stories originally appeared in Isaac Asimov's Science Fiction Magazine, The Magazine of Fantasy and Science Fiction and Weird Tales.

Contents

Voyages by Starlight contains the following stories:

 "Introduction", by Michael Swanwick
 "Ellen O’Hara"
 "Green"
 "Starship Day"
 "The Giving Mouth"
 "The Perfect Stranger"
 "Tirkiluk"
 "Papa"
 "1/72nd Scale"
 "Marnie"
 "Grownups"

Sources

1996 short story collections
Science fiction short story collections
Horror short story collections